Satay (aka sate) is a Southeast Asian dish of seasoned, skewered and grilled meat, served with a sauce.

Satay may also refer to:

 Satay sauce, a sauce 
 Satay Club, Singapore; an open-air hawker centre
 Wahid Satay (born 1930) Malaysian-Singaporean actor

See also

 
 Settee (disambiguation)
 Sette (disambiguation)
 Sete (disambiguation)
 Seti (disambiguation)
 Sati (disambiguation)